Consort Zhuang may refer to:

Empress Dowager Xiaozhuang (1613–1688), concubine of Hong Taiji
Consort Zhuang (Jiaqing) (died 1811), concubine of the Jiaqing Emperor